The Penn State Lady Lions basketball team represents Pennsylvania State University and plays its home games in the Bryce Jordan Center. In 2013, the Lady Lions became just the 12th program in NCAA Division I history to reach 850 wins. Penn State has won 8 regular season Big Ten titles and the first 2 Big Ten tournament titles in 1995 and 1996. Prior to joining the Big Ten, the Lady Lions competed in the Atlantic 10 conference. The Lady Lions have 25 NCAA tournament appearances as of 2014, the most in the Big Ten. The team's best post-season finish came in 2000 when the Lady Lions reached the Final Four before losing to eventual champion UConn. The Lady Lions captured the WNIT title in 1998 defeating Baylor 59–56 in Waco, Texas. Notable alumni include WBCA First Team All-Americans Suzie McConnell, Susan Robinson, Helen Darling, and Kelly Mazzante. ESPN correspondent Lisa Salters is the shortest player in Lady Lions history at 5'-2".

Current coaching staff

Pink Zone at Penn State
Annually, the Lady Lions don pink jerseys in support of several organizations that fight breast cancer in what is now known as the "Pink Zone at Penn State" game. The Lady Lions were the first Division I team in the nation to wear pink jerseys, a growing trend in athletics. Then-head coach Rene Portland developed the idea in 2006 with money from the Big Ten Conference, and the first game (termed the "Think Pink" game) occurred in February 2007 against Wisconsin. In 2012, the Pink Zone at Penn State raised a record $203,000 to distribute to its beneficiaries.

All-time season results

|- style="background:#ffd;"
| colspan="8" style="text-align:center;"| Atlantic 10 Conference

|- style="background:#ffd;"
| colspan="8" style="text-align:center;"| Independent

|- style="background:#ffd;"
| colspan="8" style="text-align:center;"| Big Ten Conference

* The Lady Lions finished 19–11 in 2004–05, but three wins were credited to assistant head coach Annie Troyan.

Source:

Postseason results

NCAA Division I

AIAW Division I
The Nittany Lions made one appearance in the AIAW National Division I basketball tournament, with a combined record of 0–2.

Awards and honors

Atlantic 10 awards

Big Ten awards

National and regional awards

Wade Trophy
 1992, Susan Robinson

Frances Pomeroy Naismith Award
 1988, Suzie McConnell
 2000, Helen Darling
 2013, Alex Bentley

CoSIDA Academic All-American of the Year
 2004, Kelly Mazzante

Eastern College Athletic Conference Player of the Year
 1991, Susan Robinson

WBCA Coach of the Year
 1991, Rene Portland
 2004, Rene Portland

USBWA Coach of the Year
 1991, Rene Portland
 1992, Rene Portland

Black Coaches & Administrators Female Coach of the Year
 2011, Coquese Washington
 2013, Coquese Washington

References

External links